James Primrose may refer to:

 James Primrose (Clerk of the Privy Council of Scotland) (died 1641)
 James Primrose (physician) (died 1659), English physician, son of minister Gilbert Primrose
 James Primrose, 10th Laird of Burnbrae (1746–1827), last Laird of Burnbrae